The Upper Iowa River is a  tributary of the Mississippi River in the upper Midwest of the United States.

Its headwaters rise in southeastern Minnesota, in Mower County (Le Roy and Lodi townships) near the border with Iowa. It then flows through the Iowa counties of Howard, Winneshiek, and Allamakee, and finally into the Upper Mississippi River near New Albin, Iowa. Along its course, it passes through the Iowa cities of Chester, Lime Springs, Florenceville,  Kendallville, Bluffton, and Decorah.

The Upper Iowa and its tributaries are part of the Driftless Area of Iowa, a region that was ice-free during the last ice age. Unlike areas to the south and west, the area was not planed down by glaciation or covered in glacial drift, resulting in present-day topography featuring steep-walled canyons and high-relief bluffs. Because of its intrinsic qualities and minimal development, the Upper Iowa River is the only river in Iowa eligible for designation as a National Wild and Scenic River. It has not yet attained this status, partly because much of the land and the riverbottom itself are privately owned.

The river is a destination for canoeing, taking paddlers through the scenic bluff country. Many put their canoes in at Kendallville or nearby down river, but some paddlers prefer to start at Lime Springs by the Lidtke Mill or at Florenceville.

A number of wildlife refuges and preserves dot the river's basin. Bird sightings on the river usually include bald eagles, great blue herons, turkey vultures, and barn swallows.

The Upper Iowa was sometimes historically called the "Iowa River", creating confusion with the larger Iowa River to the south. The Upper Iowa was also called the "Oneota River", and the large number of Late Prehistoric sites along its bluffs caused the early archaeologist Charles R. Keyes to name the Oneota Culture for the river.

See also
Decorah crater, a 470-million-year-old meteor crater below the Upper Iowa River.
List of Iowa rivers
List of rivers of Minnesota
List of longest streams of Minnesota

References

External links
Statistics on watershed (*.pdf) (retrieved 5 April 2007)
Water level (NOAA) (retrieved 31 March 2007)
Watershed map (retrieved 31 March 2007)
Iowa Natural Heritage Foundation (retrieved 21 March 2007)
Upper Iowa River Watershed Project  (retrieved 31 March 2007)
Lime Springs to French Creek Bridge *pdf format (retrieved 31 March 2007)
Kayaking site (retrieved 31 March 2007)
Acquisition of 1224 acres (from Waukon, Standard) (retrieved 5 April 2007)

Rivers of Iowa
Rivers of Minnesota
Tributaries of the Mississippi River
Rivers of Allamakee County, Iowa
Rivers of Fillmore County, Minnesota
Rivers of Howard County, Iowa
Rivers of Mower County, Minnesota
Rivers of Winneshiek County, Iowa
Driftless Area